Makurumla is an administrative ward in the Kinondoni district of the Dar es Salaam Region of Tanzania. In 2016 the Tanzania National Bureau of Statistics report there were 79,331 people in the ward, from 63,352 in 2012.

References

Kinondoni District
Wards of Dar es Salaam Region